Deepak Perwani (born 1963) is a Pakistani fashion designer and actor. He is a member of the Hindu Sindhi community in Pakistan.

Filmography 

 Mere Paas Paas (Hum TV)
 Kadoorat (2013 on Hum TV)
 Punjab Nahi Jaungi (2017)
Altered Skin as Farooq (2018)

References

External links

 Deepak Perwani, official website
 Deepak Perwani Raw Magazine Interview
 Outlook India article

1974 births
Pakistani fashion designers
Pakistani costume designers
Pakistani Hindus
Sindhi people
Living people
Hum Award winners